Tugulymsky District is an administrative district (raion), one of the thirty in Sverdlovsk Oblast, Russia. As a municipal division, it is incorporated as Tugulymsky Urban Okrug. Its administrative center is the urban locality (a work settlement) of Tugulym. Population: 22,581 (2010 Census);  The population of Tugulym accounts for 26.6% of the district's total population.

References

Notes

Sources

Districts of Sverdlovsk Oblast